ATV Madiun is a local television station, established in 2003 in Madiun, East Java.

See also

 RCTI
 SCTV (Indonesia)

madiun
Television channels and stations established in 2003